Corrado Micalef (born April 20, 1961) is a Canadian retired professional ice hockey goaltender who played five seasons with the Detroit Red Wings of the National Hockey League from 1981 to 1986. He later spent several years playing in Europe, retiring in 2002.

Playing career
Born in Montreal, Quebec, Micalef was drafted 44th overall by the Detroit Red Wings in 1981 after a standout junior career with the Sherbrooke Castors. In 1980, he won the Jacques Plante Memorial Trophy for having the lowest goals against average in the high scoring QMJHL. He also represented Canada at the 1981 World Junior Championships before turning pro the next season. Micalef split the 1981–82 season between the NHL and the IHL's Kalamazoo Wings.

During his time in Detroit, Micalef was chiefly used in a tandem with goaltenders Gilles Gilbert and Greg Stefan. He was voted the Wings' "Rookie of the Year" in 1981–82. He was named to the Canadian national team at the 1986 World Championships but did not play any games, before taking his hockey career to Europe in 1986–87, making stops in Switzerland, France, and Italy. He briefly returned to North America to play with the IHL's San Francisco Spiders in 1995–96 before returning to Europe to finish his playing career in Germany.

Coaching
Up to July 2013, Micalef was an assistant coach for the QMJHL's Charlottetown Islanders.

Career statistics

Regular season and playoffs

International

External links

References

1961 births
Living people
Adirondack Red Wings players
Canadian expatriate ice hockey players in France
Canadian expatriate ice hockey players in Italy
Canadian ice hockey goaltenders
Detroit Red Wings draft picks
Detroit Red Wings players
Diables Rouges de Briançon players
HC Varese players
Kalamazoo Wings (1974–2000) players
Montreal Roadrunners players
Orlando Jackals players
Ours de Villard-de-Lans players
San Jose Rhinos players
Sherbrooke Castors players
Ice hockey people from Montreal